Crassispira kachhensis is an extinct species of sea snail, a marine gastropod mollusk in the family Pseudomelatomidae, the turrids and allies.

Description
The length of the shell attains 11.5 mm, its diameter 4 mm.

Distribution
Fossils have been found in Miocene strata of Gujarat, India.and in  Pakistan; age range: 20.43 to 15.97 Ma

References

 E. Vredenburg. 1925. Description of Mollusca from the post-Eocene Tertiary formation of north-western India: Cephalopoda, Opisthobranchiata, Siphonostomata. Memoirs of the Geological Survey of India 50(1):1-350
 M. Harzhauser, M. Euter, W. E. Piller, B. Berning, A. Kroh and O. Mandic. 2009. Oligocene and Early Miocene gastropods from Kutch (NW India) document an early biogeographic switch from Western Tethys to Indo-Pacific. Paläontologische Zeitschrift 83:333-372

kachhensis
Gastropods described in 1925